Basket Torino, for sponsorship reasons Reale Mutua Torino, is an Italian basketball club based in Turin. Established in 2019 as successor of Auxilium Torino, the club will make its debut in the 2019–20 Serie A2 Basket.

History
In June 2019, Auxilium Torino was dissolved after the club was declared bankrupt after months of financial struggles, which had led to relegation from the Lega Basket Serie A in May. As a result, Reale Mutua Basket Torino was founded after Stefano Sardara moved his club Dinamo Academy Cagliari from Cagliari to Turin. The team will make its debut in the 2019–20 season in the Serie A2 Basket, Italy's second tier. Stefano Sardara was the majority holder with 75% while the Una Mole di Basket organization owns 25% of the club. On 21 June 2019, Demis Cavina was announced as head coach. On 5 July 2019, the team's logo featuring a Turin bull was presented.

In the club's debut 2019–20 season, Torino was first in the West Division with an 18–8 record, before the season was cancelled due to the COVID-19 pandemic. In July 2020, a group of Turkish investors led by basketball coach Ergin Ataman became owners of the club.

In the 2021 the team competes in the Green Division of A2 league. A season without the live support of fans due to COVID-19 pandemic. The regular season ends with 18-7 record, first place. In the post season "fase ad orologio" Torino catches the second place with a record of 6-4 and get the chance to play home in the key matches of the playoffs "Silver Tournament".
Quarter of Finals are won 3-0 against Mantova, Semifinals are won 3-0 against Verona, Finals are lost 2-3 against Tortona that got the promotion to LBA serie A.
 
In July 2021 the ownership moves from Stefano Sardara and Ergin Ataman to David Avino that will held the role of president of Basket Torino.

Sponsorship names
Due to sponsorships reasons, the team has been known as:
Reale Mutua Torino (2019–present)

Players

Roster 2022/23

References

External links
Twitter profile

2019 establishments in Italy
Basketball teams established in 2019
Basketball teams in Piedmont
Sport in Turin